Touques is a commune in the Calvados department in the Normandy region in northwestern France. It is situated on the river Touques, 3 km southeast of the sea resort Deauville.

History
 Eliezer (ben Solomon) of Touques was a French tosafist, who lived at Touques in the second half of the thirteenth century. He abridged the tosafot of Samson of Sens, Samuel of Évreux, and many others, and added thereto marginal notes of his own, entitled "Gilyon Tosafot," or "Tosafot Gillayon". 
On 1 August 1417 Henry V of England, landed there.
On 7 March 2021 Olivier Dassault crash landed on board a helicopter there.

Population

International relations
Touques is twinned with:
 Sankt Andreasberg (Germany)
 Strathspey, Scotland

See also
Communes of the Calvados department

References

External links

 Official site

Communes of Calvados (department)
Calvados communes articles needing translation from French Wikipedia